Manjit Walia  is an Indian athlete. She won a bronze medal in 80 Metres hurdles in 1966 Asian Games.

References

Indian female hurdlers
Athletes (track and field) at the 1966 Asian Games
Asian Games bronze medalists for India
Asian Games medalists in athletics (track and field)
Medalists at the 1966 Asian Games
Recipients of the Arjuna Award
Ahluwalia